SOCAR Tower is a skyscraper in Baku, Azerbaijan. It is the 4th tallest building in Baku and in Azerbaijan. The skyscraper serves as the headquarters of SOCAR (State Oil Company of Azerbaijan Republic). Construction started in 2010 and was completed in 2016, where it became the tallest building in Baku until it was surpassed by the Port Baku Towers. SOCAR Tower is located on Heydar Aliyev Avenue, a long highway from the main airport to downtown Baku, which is visible on the way to the city center. It is one of Baku's major landmarks, along with the Flame Towers.

Design
The building, which was designed by Heerim Architects from South Korea, is an example of structural expressionism. It is composed of two towers which curve around each other as they rise, according to skyscraper.com, "the seemingly shorter tower almost looks like its resting its head on the chest of the taller tower. The taller towers peak slightly bending over it in a confident, reassuring and comforting manner". The headquarter mainly houses office space, but it also has conference and sports facilities, a guest house, retail spaces and food outlets.

The building's design is based on a composite system of steel construction (made by Permasteelisa Group) with reinforced concrete walls.

The building, designed by South Korean Heerim Architects & Planners Co. Ltd, based on the concept of "wind and fire", was built by the Turkish company Tekfen Construction and Installation.

Gallery

See also
 List of twisted buildings

References

Buildings and structures under construction in Azerbaijan
Buildings and structures in Baku
Skyscrapers in Azerbaijan
SOCAR
Twisted buildings and structures
Skyscraper office buildings